Laib is a surname. Notable people with the surname include: 

Andreas Laib (born 1972), German rower
Paul Laib (1869–1958), British photographer
Wolfgang Laib (born 1950), German artist

See also
Lail